The 2022 French legislative election occurred on 4 and 18 June 2022 (America and Caribbean Zone) and 5 and 19 June 2022 (Rest of the world). In the single member constituencies for French residents overseas, 11 deputies were elected, representing French people living outside France. It is the third time French citizens living abroad will be represented in the National Assembly after the previous elections in 2012 and 2017.

Results

References 

2022 French legislative election
Constituencies for French residents overseas